Mathias Emilio Pettersen (born 3 April 2000) is a Norwegian professional ice hockey player currently with the Calgary Wranglers in the American Hockey League (AHL) while under contract with the Calgary Flames of the National Hockey League (NHL). He was selected by the Flames in the 2018 NHL Entry Draft and previously played collegiate hockey with the University of Denver of the National Collegiate Hockey Conference (NCHC) and junior for the Omaha Lancers and Muskegon Lumberjacks of the United States Hockey League (USHL). Pettersen's early career was met with great expectations. Supporters and newspapers started covering his career when he was 6 years old.

Playing career

Pettersen first played minor hockey for Manglerud Star and Lørenskog IK, often at age levels several years older than his own. He was invited to move to Sweden at age 13 and join the youth program of Färjestad BK, but instead opted to move to the United States in 2013. He joined South Kent School of the United States Premier Hockey League in 2014. He spent two season with South Kent, scoring 41 points in 28 games the first season, and 65 points in 40 games the second. 

He signed a tender with Omaha Lancers of the United States Hockey League on 4 January 2016. After one season with Omaha, where he recorded 27 points in 57 games, Pettersen was traded to the Muskegon Lumberjacks. He has committed to joining the University of Denver in 2018.

Following his sophomore season, Pettersen concluded his collegiate career by signing a three-year, entry-level contact with the Calgary Flames on 27 April 2020.

International play
Pettersen's first International Ice Hockey Federation (IIHF) tournament was the 2016 IIHF World U18 Championship Division I. He appeared in 5 games for Norway and recorded five points. He returned for the 2017 IIHF World U18 Championship Division I, and led the tournament in scoring with 12 points in 5 games.

Pettersen made his senior debut with Norway at the 2021 World Championships. He played 6 games and scored one goal.

Personal life
Pettersen's father, Flemming Pettersen, is a former ice hockey player who played for Manglerud Star and Spektrum Flyers in the Norwegian league.

Career statistics

Regular season and playoffs

International

References

External links
 

2000 births
Living people
Calgary Flames draft picks
Calgary Wranglers players
Denver Pioneers men's ice hockey players
Ice hockey players at the 2016 Winter Youth Olympics
Muskegon Lumberjacks players
Norwegian ice hockey centres
Omaha Lancers players
South Kent School alumni
Ice hockey people from Oslo
Stockton Heat players